Belgium sent 32 athletes to the 2006 European Athletics Championships, which is a very big delegation for Belgium, as they only once sent more athletes, 44 to the 1950 European Athletics Championships. The most important names were Kim Gevaert, Tia Hellebaut and Cédric Van Branteghem.

Results

Competitors

References

Nations at the 2006 European Athletics Championships
European Athletics Championships
2006